Fujizakura Yoshimori (富士櫻栄守) (born 9 February 1948 as Hideo Nakasawa) is a former sumo wrestler from Kōfu, Yamanashi, Japan. His highest rank was sekiwake. He wrestled for Takasago stable. He made his debut in 1963 and had one of the longest professional careers of any wrestler, fighting 1613 bouts in total, of which 1543 were consecutive. This latter record is second only to Aobajō.  After his retirement in 1985 he was an elder of the Japan Sumo Association and the head coach of Nakamura stable.

Career
He was the eldest son of a farmer, and was enrolled in the judo club at junior high school. He made his professional debut in March 1963. He was given the shikona of Fujizakura, meaning "cherry of Fuji", a reference to the prefectural flower of Yamanashi, a small pale red and white flower that blooms only around Mount Fuji. He reached sekitori status in January 1970 and was promoted to the top makuuchi division in September 1971. He was a runner-up in only his second honbasho or tournament in the division and was awarded the Fighting Spirit Prize. He fought in makuuchi for 73 tournaments in total, winning eight special prizes, and nine gold stars for defeating yokozuna. His highest rank was sekiwake, which he reached in March 1974. 

He was demoted to the jūryō division on two occasions in 1979 and 1980, but each time made an immediate comeback to makuuchi. His final top division tournament was in January 1984, where he had to withdraw through injury – coincidentally, his long-time stablemate Takamiyama withdrew from the same tournament and this was also his final makuuchi appearance. This brought to an end Fujizakura's run of 1543 consecutive appearances from his professional debut, which was the most in sumo history at the time. As of 2017 it is second only to Aobajō's 1630 consecutive bouts. 

He was a favourite of Emperor Shōwa, a noted fan of sumo. His May 1975 bout with Kirinji in which he thrust at his opponent over 50 times but lost, was named one of the "Best 10 All Time Battles in Ozumo" by the Nikkei newspaper.

Retirement from sumo
Fujizakura retired in March 1985, after facing demotion to the makushita division. He became an elder of the Japan Sumo Association, opening up Nakamura stable in 1986, taking four jonokuchi ranked wrestlers from Takasago stable. He had a policy of not accepting foreign-born wrestlers or makushita tsukedashi entrants with a college sumo background, and encouraged his wrestlers to obtain high school diplomas by correspondence courses over the internet.   
He produced a handful of jūryō ranked wrestlers but none reached the top division. He also served as a judge of tournament bouts for over 20 years, and held the post of Deputy Director of Judging. Nakamura stable closed at the end of 2012, and he retired from the Sumo Association upon turning 65 in February 2013.

Fighting style
Fujizakura was a pusher-thruster who preferred oshi-sumo techniques to fighting on the mawashi or belt (yotsu-sumo). His speciality was tsuppari, a series of rapid thrusts to the opponent's chest. He was small by sumo standards, but was such an enthusiastic trainer in his younger days that he even had to be warned by his stablemaster at the time, former yokozuna Maedayama, not to over-train.

Personal life
His eldest son , born in 1976, is a folk singer.

Career record

See also
List of sumo record holders
Glossary of sumo terms
List of sumo tournament top division runners-up
List of sumo tournament second division champions
List of past sumo wrestlers
List of sekiwake

References

1948 births
Living people
Japanese sumo wrestlers
Sumo people from Yamanashi Prefecture
Sekiwake